The 1997 Women's African Volleyball Championship was the Eight Edition African continental volleyball Championship for women in Africa and it was held in Lagos, Nigeria with Five teams participated.

Teams

Final ranking

References

1997 Women
African championship, Women
Women's African Volleyball Championship
International volleyball competitions hosted by Egypt